Sporting Club Trestina Associazione Sportiva Dilettantistica or simply Trestina is an Italian association football club, based in Trestina, a frazione of Città di Castello Umbria.

Sporting Trestina currently plays in Serie D group E.

History 
The club was founded in 1966. In the season 2010–11 it was promoted, for the first time, from Eccellenza Umbria to Serie D.

Colors and badge 
The team's color are white and black.

External links 
Official Site

Football clubs in Italy
Football clubs in Umbria
Association football clubs established in 1966
Italian football clubs established in 1966